Calonectria indusiata is a fungal plant pathogen with several hosts.

Infected plants
See:
 List of azalea diseases
 List of foliage plant diseases (Palmae)
 List of rhododendron diseases
 List of tea diseases

References

External links

Fungal plant pathogens and diseases
Tea diseases
Ornamental plant pathogens and diseases
Nectriaceae
Fungi described in 2002